Pomanota (possibly from Aymara puma cougar, puma, -n(i) a suffix, uta house, "house of the puma") is a mountain in the Vilcanota mountain range in the Andes of Peru, about  high. It is situated in the Cusco Region, Canchis Province, San Pablo District and in the Puno Region, Carabaya Province, Corani District as well as in the Melgar Province, Nuñoa District. Pomanota lies southeast of the Joyllor Puñuna, the highest elevation in the glaciated area of Quelccaya (Quechua for "snow plain"), and northwest of the Jonorana.

References

Mountains of Peru
Mountains of Cusco Region
Mountains of Puno Region
Glaciers of Peru